F33, earlier Fo5a and F5, is a Swedish baggage car of the 1960s-car designed and manufactured by Kalmar Verkstad (KVAB) between 1961 and 1962 for the only customer SJ. The wagons feature a  storage area for luggage, as well as a rest area for the staff of the train. In the year of 2000 SJ decided to discontinue their use of luggage cars which subsequently led to the F33 being phased out immediately.

References 
F24K/F33 på Järnväg.net
Svenska Person- och Motorvagnar 1999, SJK Skriftserie nr. 69, Stockholm 1999 

Rolling stock of Sweden
Passenger railroad cars